Sunter Island is an island in the Aboriginal Shire of Lockhart River, Queensland, Australia.

Geography 
It is part of the Great Barrier Reef Marine Park in Lloyd Bay between Lockhart River and Cape Direction, Queensland. It is approximately 0.01 square kilometers in size.

References

Islands on the Great Barrier Reef
Aboriginal Shire of Lockhart River